Mitchell Hibberd (born 23 September 1996) is a professional Australian rules footballer who played for Australian Football League (AFL) clubs North Melbourne and Essendon, and Victorian Football League (VFL) club Williamstown.

Early life 
Hibberd is the son of Tasmanian business tycoon and ex Clarence Football Club legend Michael Hibberd. He was born and raised in Tasmania, and moved to Melbourne to play AFL football after being drafted in 2015.

AFL career 
Hibberd was drafted by the North Melbourne Football Club with pick 33 in the 2015 national draft. He made his debut against  in the opening round of the 2017 season at Etihad Stadium. He was delisted by North Melbourne at the end of the 2018 AFL season. 

Hibberd spent the 2019 season with Victorian Football League club Williamstown, where he was named in the VFL Team of the Year and led the club for votes in the J.J. Liston Trophy count. He was recruited by the Essendon Football Club in the 2019 Rookie draft. He played five games for Essendon in 2020 before being delisted in September 2020. He returned to Williamstown in 2021 wearing the number 2 jersey.

Television career 
In 2021, Hibberd appeared as a contestant on the third season of  Nine Network's dating reality show Love Island Australia
He and partner Tina Provis were crowned the winners during the final, broadcast on the 24th November 2021, taking home the $50,000 prize money between them. In 2022, Hibberd returned for the fourth season of Love Island Australia.

References

External links

 

1996 births
Living people
North Melbourne Football Club players
Clarence Football Club players
Australian rules footballers from Tasmania
Essendon Football Club players
Williamstown Football Club players
Werribee Football Club players